Vetzberg  is a hill and extinct volcano of Hesse, Germany.

References 

Mountains of Hesse